The FIL European Luge Championships 1973 took place in Königssee, West Germany for the second consecutive year and third time overall (1967, 1972).

Men's singles

Women's singles

Men's doubles

Medal table

References
Men's doubles European champions
Men's singles European champions
Women's singles European champions

FIL European Luge Championships
1973 in luge
Luge in Germany
1973 in German sport